HJ Grievink (born June 14, 1977) is a Dutch graphic designer and editor based in Amsterdam. He works on a range of commissioned and self-initiated projects positioned at the intersection of graphic design and visual culture research. Grievink is best known for designing and co-editing the book Next Nature: Nature Changes Along With Us, and for developing the memory games, Fake for Real and Brand Memory.

Projects

Next Nature 
Grievink is editor and resident designer of the networked think- and design tank Next Nature Network. 
In 2011 he co-edited the book Next Nature: Nature Changes Along With Us with Koert Van Mensvoort. Scientific American magazine described it as “a beautiful, thoughtful, and thought-provoking collection of images and essays.”

Fake for Real 
Grievink has created memory games for Dutch publishing house BIS. In 2007 he designed Fake for Real, a memory game about reality and simulation in our media society. The game uses historical and contemporary images to playfully visualize the classical theme of fake and real. The game is now in its 6th printing.

Brand Memory 
In 2011 Grievink designed the game Brand Memory which challenges players' ability to recognize major brands through the association of visual cues alone. Brand Memory tests a players' knowledge of commercial branding and confronts the player to recognize icons he knows without even noticing. The memory game was inspired after the regular performances Grievink gives, where he reads aloud descriptions of iconic brands as they are projected on the screen.

Wiki Loves Art 
Grievink has designed several books that reflect on design and visual culture. He conceptualized and designed Wiki Loves Art, a book which documents Wiki Loves Art/NL, a monthlong competition in the Netherlands and a part of the Wikipedia:Wikipedia Loves Art initiative which allowed visitors and photographers to take pictures of artworks usually off limits across 46 Dutch museums. Following the competition, pictures were uploaded to the Wiki Loves Art/NL Flickr group, and have since been added to the Wikimedia Commons archive. Wiki Loves Art includes a collection of photos from the competition, essays and remixes of photographs by artists and designers, amongst them Metahaven and Amie Dicke.

Open Design Now 
Grievink conceptualized and designed Open Design Now: Why Design Cannot Remain Exclusive. The book is a production of Premsela Netherlands Institute for Design and Fashion, Waag Society and Creative Commons Netherlands in association with BIS Publishers about open design.

Artificial Womb 
Starting in 2018 he is currently working with Lisa Mandemaker and Guid Oei of Maxima Medical Centre, to design an artificial womb with the purpose of developing premature childbirths (24–28 months) and increase their survivability.

Presentations and lectures 
2003 BNO Delta Romeo, Rotterdam
2007 Contemporary Undercurrents, Designplatform Rotterdam
2007 Museum of Contemporary Design and Applied Arts, Lausanne (Switzerland)
2007 Zefir7, The Hague
2007 Xiamen University, Xiamen (China)
2008 Art Center College of Design, Pasadena, CA (USA)
2008 East China Normal University, Shanghai (China)
2010 My First Swastika, during The Great Dictators, TrouwAmsterdam
2010 Wiki Loves Art, at Critical Point of View Wikipedia conference, Amsterdam
2010 Central Academy of Fine Arts (CAFA), Beijing (China)
2011 Next Nature Power Show, Stadsschouwburg Amsterdam
2011 BNO spellbound, Amsterdam

Academic 
Grievink received his bachelor's degree in Graphic Design from ArtEZ Hogeschool voor de Kunsten  (1994-1999). He holds a Master's in Design from Sandberg Institute (2005-2007), the postgraduate course of the Gerrit Rietveld Academie in Amsterdam.

Bibliography 
Hendrik-Jan Grievink writes articles, creates games, and co-authored a book.

I Read Where I Am
Brand Memory
Fake for Real
Next Nature: Nature Changes Along With Us
Open Design Now
Style First
Wiki Loves Art
The In Vitro Meat Cookbook

References

External links
 Official website for the Next Nature Foundation
 Official website for the Next Nature Power Show
 Website of  Fake For Real memory game

1977 births
Living people
Dutch graphic designers
Gerrit Rietveld Academie alumni
People from Aalten